The Alchemist's Cookbook is an EP by producer The Alchemist. The EP was digitally released on iTunes on November 18, 2008, before his second full-length album Chemical Warfare in 2009.  Guest appearances include Prodigy, Evidence, Blu, and Kid Cudi.

Track listing

References 

Albums produced by the Alchemist (musician)
2008 EPs
The Alchemist (musician) albums